Baryshevo is the name of several rural localities in Russia:
Baryshevo, Leningrad Oblast, a logging depot settlement in Goncharovskoye Settlement Municipal Formation of Vyborgsky District of Leningrad Oblast
Baryshevo, Nizhny Novgorod Oblast, a village in Nikolo-Pogostinsky Selsoviet of Gorodetsky District of Nizhny Novgorod Oblast
Baryshevo, Novosibirsk Oblast, a selo in Novosibirsky District of Novosibirsk Oblast